The Blue Yonder Twin Engine EZ Flyer is a Canadian designed and built, pusher configuration twin-engined, tandem two-seat, open cockpit aircraft provided as a completed aircraft or in kit form by Blue Yonder Aviation.

The aircraft can be constructed in Canada as a basic ultra-light, or amateur-built aircraft.

Development
The Twin Engine EZ Flyer was designed by Wayne Winters of Indus, Alberta and based on the earlier EZ Flyer. Taking inspiration from the twin-engined Ultraflight Lazair and the Leza-Lockwood Air Cam the aircraft was especially designed for the air-to-ground photography role and also for use over hostile terrain where twin engine safety was desirable.

The fuselage was also stretched  to  total, to give a more unimpeded view from the front seat. The aircraft retained the Junker's ailerons of the original Merlin wing along with the Clark "Y" airfoil and construction featuring a leading edge "D" cell and foam ribs. Like the original EZ Flyer, the twin engine version has an open lattice, "N" girder fuselage constructed from 4130 steel tube along with an enlarged vertical tail to improve handling in engine-out situations.

The prototype of the new design flew in 1999.

The Twin Engine EZ Flyer can be equipped with a variety of powerplants, all mounted side-by-side in pusher configuration:

Rotax 503 
Rotax 582 
Rotax 912 
Rotax 912S

Operational history
Despite being widely demonstrated and reviewed, the prototype remains the sole registered example.

Operators
 Blue Yonder Aviation - flight school

Specifications (Twin Engine EZ Flyer)

See also

References

External links

 Blue Yonder Aviation archives

Twin-engined pusher aircraft
Twin Engine EZ Flyer
1990s Canadian ultralight aircraft
Homebuilt aircraft
Parasol-wing aircraft